The Armenian Gampr is an Armenian breed of flock guardian dog native to the Armenian Highlands. It falls within the Ovcharka group of livestock guardian dogs, which can be found throughout the Transcaucasus area. It was recognised in 2011 by the International Kennel Union in Moscow, under the guidance of the Armenian Kennel Club, which had developed the breed standard in the 1990s.

History 
The Gampr is the traditional flock guardian dog of Armenia. From the 1920s, when Armenia came under the control of the Soviet Union, large numbers of the dogs were taken to Russia, where they played a crucial part in the development of the Caucasian Shepherd Dog, or Caucasian Ovcharka. A few were exported to the United States at about the same time.

Following the independence of Armenia in 1991, the dog acquired new significance as national heritage. The first breed standard was drawn up in the 1990s, and in 2011 the breed was recognised by the International Kennel Union, an organisation based in Moscow.

Characteristics 
The coat may be of any colour; it may be short or long, and always has a soft undercoat.

Use 
The principal traditional use of the Gampr was as a flock guardian dog, protecting flocks of sheep and goats from attack – particularly by wolves – on the upland pastures of mountainous regions of Armenia. Although sheep-herding has declined in the country since independence, wolves continue to threaten flocks; in 2006 some 2000 dogs were still in use for this purpose. They may also be used to guard people and property, another traditional use.

Gallery

References 

Dog breeds originating in Asia
Animal breeds originating in Armenia
Dog breeds originating in Turkey
Livestock guardian dogs
